Sky 4: Forthcoming is the fourth studio album by English/Australian instrumental progressive rock band Sky, released in 1982. It is the only Sky album to contain no original compositions - except for Kevin Peek's rewrite of a 13th-century melody - relying instead on the band's arrangements of other (mostly classical) composers' pieces.

In 2015 Esoteric Recordings continued a schedule of remasters and expanded releases with this recording.

Track listing

2015 two disc reissue edition

Personnel

Sky
 John Williams - Guitar
 Steve Gray - Synthesizers, Piano, Keyboard, Harpsichord, Clavinet
 Herbie Flowers - Double Bass, Bass Guitar
 Tristan Fry - Drums, Marimba, Celeste
 Kevin Peek - Guitar

Additional
 Peter Lyster-Todd - Management
 Chris Blair - Mastering
 Brian Griffin - Photography
 Cooke Key - Design
 Sky, Tony Clark, Haydn Bendall - Production

Charts

Certifications

References

1982 albums
Sky (English/Australian band) albums